Chaplygina is a rural locality and the administrative center of Pashkovsky Selsoviet Rural Settlement, Kursky District, Kursk Oblast, Russia. Population:

Geography 
The village is located on the Obmet River (a right tributary of the Tuskar in the basin of the Seym), 102 km from the Russia–Ukraine border, 7 km north of the district center – the town Kursk.

 Climate
Chaplygina has a warm-summer humid continental climate (Dfb in the Köppen climate classification).

Transport 
Chaplygina is located 6.5 km from the federal route  Crimea Highway (a part of the European route ), 7.5 km from the road of regional importance  (Kursk – Ponyri), 6.5 km from the road of intermunicipal significance  (Kursk – Iskra), on the road  (38N-379 – Chaplygina – Alyabyevo), 8 km from the nearest railway halt Bukreyevka (railway line Oryol – Kursk).

The rural locality is situated 16 km from Kursk Vostochny Airport, 138 km from Belgorod International Airport and 211 km from Voronezh Peter the Great Airport.

References

Notes

Sources

Rural localities in Kursky District, Kursk Oblast